Malaysia Open is an annual Malaysian badminton tournament created in 1937 and played at the Axiata Arena in the Bukit Jalil suburb of Kuala Lumpur, Malaysia.

History 
The Malaysia Open is played in the first week of July (as of July 2019, prior to this it was first week in April and 2nd week in January) and is chronologically the first of the five BWF World Tour Super 750 tournaments of the badminton season. In between 2014 and 2017, it has been chronologically the first or second (after the All England Open Badminton Championships) of the five BWF Super Series Premier tournaments. The event was not held from 1942 to 1946 because of World War II and again from 1967 to 1982.

In the Amateur Era, Wong Peng Soon (1940–1941, 1947, 1949–1953) holds the record for the most titles in the men's singles, winning Malaysia Open eight times. Wong also holds the record for most consecutive titles with five (from 1949 to 1953).

In the Open Era, since the inclusion of all global professional badminton players in 1980, Lee Chong Wei (2004–2006, 2008–2014, 2016, 2018) holds the record for the most men's singles titles with twelve. Lee Chong Wei (2008–2014) also holds the record for most consecutive victories with seven.

Lee Chong Wei is the only player in history, in both the Amateur and Open Era, to reach the Malaysia Open men's singles final fourteen times.

Finalists

Statistics

Multiple champions

Championships by country

See also 
 List of Malaysia Open women's singles champions

External links 
Malaysia Open - Past Champions men's singles, from InternationalBadminton.org

References